Nikki DeLoach is an American actress.

Early life
DeLoach was born in Waycross, Georgia. She is the eldest of three children of Terri, Pierce County School superintendent and David DeLoach, an owner of a wood products company. She has a sister LeAnne and a brother Brett. They grew up on a farm. As a child, she was heavily involved in the pageant world, winning numerous state and national titles. DeLoach secured an agent for modeling at a young age and landed several jobs for print ad modeling. She and her mother spent one summer in New York City to pursue modeling jobs. DeLoach was a member of the Georgia 4-H Performing Arts group Clovers & Company from 1991 to 1994.

Career
Deloach joined the All-New Mickey Mouse Club in 1993. Fellow cast members included future actors Keri Russell and Ryan Gosling, and future pop stars Britney Spears, Christina Aguilera, Justin Timberlake, and JC Chasez. For several years, she dated Chasez, who became a member of boy band *NSYNC with Timberlake. She was mentioned by her nickname Peaches in the liner notes of the group's first American album. When The Mickey Mouse Club was cancelled in 1994, DeLoach returned to her local high school for a short time before moving with her grandmother to Los Angeles to pursue an acting career. Her work included television appearances in Misery Loves Company and movie roles in Gunfighter's Moon and The Traveller.

In 1998, she became a member of the girl group Innosense. The group was managed by Justin Timberlake's mother, Lynn Harless. Innosense was an opening act for both *NSYNC and Britney Spears, and it had lukewarm success in Europe, but minimal impact in the US. The group had a cameo in the film Longshot before calling it quits in 2003.

After Innosense's breakup, DeLoach focused on acting. Her film work includes the sequel of the Sandra Bullock thriller The Net, called The Net 2.0, and a role in the series Emerald Cove, alongside some of her fellow Mouseketeers. On television, she starred in the series  North Shore. on Fox and Windfall. She also has made guest appearances in Grounded for Life, Walker: Texas Ranger, Cold Case, and CSI: NY. DeLoach played Lacey Hamilton, the mother of the main character Jenna Hamilton, on MTV's Awkward.

She played in the French comedy film Hollywoo with Florence Foresti. She occasionally co-hosts on The Young Turks livestream.

She has starred in several films on the Hallmark Channel.

Personal life
DeLoach married Ryan Goodell, who was a member of the boy band Take 5, in September 2009. In April 2013, DeLoach announced that she was pregnant. Their son William Hudson Goodell was born on October 22, 2013. Their second son, Bennett Christopher Goodell, was born on September 20, 2017.

Filmography

Film

Television

References

External links

 Nikki DeLoach Profile on Music Television

20th-century American actresses
21st-century American actresses
Actresses from Georgia (U.S. state)
American child actresses
American child singers
American film actresses
American soap opera actresses
American television actresses
Innosense members
Living people
Mouseketeers
Singers from Georgia (U.S. state)
People from Waycross, Georgia
People from Blackshear, Georgia
21st-century American singers
21st-century American women singers
Year of birth missing (living people)